Larmor-Plage is a commune in the Morbihan department of Brittany in north-western France.

History
Larmor-Plage was created as a new commune in 1925. Before that, it came within the administrative area of the town of Ploemeur. It was almost completely destroyed in World War II.

Larmor-Plage is twinned with the town of Youghal in County Cork, Ireland.

Population

Sights
The church Notre-Dame-de-Larmor is located in the centre of the town. It was built in the fifteenth century.

Environment
Kerguelen is a natural park.

Sports
Windsurfing is an important activity. The nautical centre of Kerguelen is the first school of sailing in France.

See also
Communes of the Morbihan department

References

External links

Official site 

 Mayors of Morbihan Association 

Communes of Morbihan
Seaside resorts in France